Zygogramma disrupta is a species of beetle belonging to the family Chrysomelidae.

Description
Z. disrupta is a small leaf beetle with a brown pronotum and yellow elytra marked with elongated brown stripes.

Distribution and Habitat
Z. disrupta can be found in North America, and was introduced to Russia in the 1980s.

Adult beetles are associated with Ragweed (family Ambrosia), especially the species Ambrosia artemisiifolia and A. psilostachya.

References

External links

References for Zygogramma disrupta at the Biodiversity Heritage Library

Chrysomelinae
Beetles described in 1856
Beetles of North America